ARTA FM is a Syrian community radio station. It was established on 6 July 2013 in Amudah. A multi-ethnic Syrian team in several cities in al-Hasakah and Aleppo is producing radio programs in Kurdish, Syriac, Arabic and Armenian. A with Arta FM allied radio station, Jin FM, produces a program for women. As of 2013, the Radio had about 45 employees. It is supported by the US government and the Konrad Adenauer Foundation.

ARTA FM has five 500W FM transmitters in the Syrian cities Amudah, Qamishli, Al-Malikiyah (Derik),  Ras al-Ayn (Sere Kaniyê) and Ayn al-Arab (Kobani).

External links
 ARTA FM - live stream
 ARTA FM - Facebook page, with information and audio files of the daily programs.
 ARTA FM - SoundCloud page, with audio files of the daily programs

Notes and sources

References
Al Jazeera (2015). "الإذاعات السوريّة.. الصوت في مواجهة الموت"
Checks&Balances (2014). "A Voice for Tolerance, a Voice for Hope"
International Press Institute (2014). "Ban on Syrian station's news reports lifted"
WDR TV (2014).. "Kurdisches Radio für die Region Kobane2"
Schweizer Radio und Fernsehen (2014). "Wir alle haben gehofft, dass der Terror endlich bekämpft wird"
Newsweek (2013).  "Mike Giglio: The Battle For Syria's Hearts And Minds-And Ears"
BBC World Service (2013). "Interview with Siruan H. Hossein, Director of ARTA FM" Soundcloud
Die Welt (2013). "Peter Steinbach: Ein syrisches Wunschkonzert im Radio"
Syria Untold (2013). "First Kurdish Radio Breaks the Sphere of Arabic Hegemony in Syria"

Radio stations in Syria
Armenian-language radio stations
Arabic-language radio stations
Kurdish-language mass media
Syriac language
Indigenous radio